The 1947 Maine Black Bears football team was an American football team that represented the University of Maine as a member of the Yankee Conference during the 1947 college football season. In its third season under head coach George E. Allen, the team compiled a 6–1 record (2–1 against conference opponents) and finished in second place in the Yankee Conference.

The team played its home games at Alumni Field in Orono, Maine, and was led on offense by backs Phil Coulombe, Henry "Rabbit" Dombkowski, and Hal Parady, and end Alan Wing.

Schedule

References

Maine
Maine Black Bears football seasons
Maine Black Bears football